Robert MacArthur Crawford (July 27, 1899 – March 12, 1961) is known for writing The U.S. Air Force song.  He was born in Dawson City, Yukon, and spent his childhood in Fairbanks, Alaska.  He graduated high school in 1915 at Chehalis High School in Chehalis, Washington. During World War I he attempted to become a pilot in the United States Army Air Service but was dismissed when he was discovered to be underage. He attended the Case Scientific Institute in Cleveland, known today as Case Western Reserve University, where he was a member of the Phi Kappa Psi fraternity.  Crawford then enrolled in Princeton University, and graduated in 1925.  He later studied and taught at the Juilliard School of Music.  Crawford learned how to fly an airplane in 1923.  He flew himself around the United States in a small plane to concerts, where he was introduced as "The Flying Baritone."  Liberty magazine sponsored a contest in 1938 for a musical composition that would become the official song of the U.S. Army Air Corps.  Out of 757 submissions, Crawford's was chosen as the winner.  The song was officially introduced at the Cleveland Air Races on Sept. 2, 1939, where Crawford sang its first public rendition.

During World War II, Crawford flew for the Air Transport Command of the U.S. Army Air Forces.  In 1947, Crawford joined the University of Miami's music faculty.  He remained there for ten years, until he left to focus on composing.

Footnotes

References

External links
Robert M. Crawford Songs, 1923–1961
The US Army Air Corps Song and the composer Robert M. Crawford 

1899 births
1961 deaths
American male songwriters
Case Western Reserve University alumni
Juilliard School alumni
Juilliard School faculty
People from Dawson City
Military personnel from Fairbanks, Alaska
People from Miami-Dade County, Florida
Princeton University alumni
United States Air Force officers
University of Miami faculty
20th-century American musicians
Songwriters from New York (state)
Songwriters from Florida
Songwriters from Alaska
20th-century American male musicians